Aleksandar Đorđević (also transliterated Aleksandar Djordjević; born 14 July 1968) is a football coach and former player.

He was part of the FK Partizan era that enjoyed great success in the Yugoslav First League in the late 1980s, finishing in the top three four times between 1986 and 1992 (including winning the 1986–87 Yugoslav First League). He was part of the squad that won the 1988–89 Yugoslav Cup.

After a brief spell with FK Napredak Kruševac, He eventually moved to Australia and joined the Morwell Falcons in 1993 and formed part of their late-season run towards the 1993–94 National Soccer League finals, which they missed by a solitary point.

In August 2013 Đorđević was appointed to the coaching staff of the Faroe Islands women's national football team.

Honours
FC Zürich
Swiss Cup: 1999–2000

References

External links
 
 
 Aleksandar Djordjevic at FaroeSoccer
 Photo album at crno-bela-nostalgija.blogspot.ca

1968 births
Living people
FK Partizan players
FK Napredak Kruševac players
Serbian footballers
Serbian expatriate footballers
Serbian expatriate sportspeople in Switzerland
Expatriate footballers in Switzerland
Serbian expatriate sportspeople in Slovenia
Slovenian PrvaLiga players
Expatriate footballers in Slovenia
Bonnyrigg White Eagles FC players
ND Gorica players
FC Zürich players
KÍ Klaksvík players
Expatriate footballers in the Faroe Islands
Gippsland Falcons players
Association football defenders